Osternienburger Land is a municipality in the district of Anhalt-Bitterfeld, in Saxony-Anhalt, Germany. It was formed on 1 January 2010 by the merger of the former municipalities Chörau, Diebzig, Dornbock, Drosa, Elsnigk, Großpaschleben, Kleinpaschleben, Libbesdorf, Micheln, Osternienburg, Reppichau, Trinum, Wulfen and Zabitz. These 14 former municipalities are now Ortschaften or municipal divisions of Osternienburger Land.

References

 
Anhalt-Bitterfeld